Engelhard Dam is a dam on the Letaba River, between the Letaba and Olifants Rest camps in the Kruger National Park, Limpopo, South Africa. Its main function is to regulate water flow down the Letaba in the direction of Mozambique.

The construction of the dam in the 1970s was funded by the American industrialist Charles Engelhard.

See also
List of reservoirs and dams in South Africa
List of rivers of South Africa

Dams in South Africa